Bezenškovo Bukovje is a settlement in the Municipality of Vojnik in eastern Slovenia. It lies in the hills east of Frankolovo off the main road from Vojnik to Slovenske Konjice. The area is part of the traditional region of Styria. It is now included with the rest of the municipality in the Savinja Statistical Region.

Name
The name of the settlement was changed from Bukovje to Bezenškovo Bukovje in 1953.

Cultural heritage
A small chapel-shrine in the village was built in 1897 at the initiative of Anton Bezenšek.

Notable people
Notable people that were born or lived in Bezenškovo Bukovje include:
Anton Bezenšek (1854–1915), linguist and shorthand expert

References

External links
Bezenškovo Bukovje at Geopedia (map, aerial photography)
Bezenškovo Bukovje on Google Maps (map, street view)

Populated places in the Municipality of Vojnik